Arcana is a symphonic poem for large orchestra by French composer Edgard Varèse. It was composed between 1925 and 1927, with a later revision in 1931–32.

Background 

As stated in letters to his wife, Louise Varèse, in New York, Varèse first conceived a few motifs that would later be used in Arcana in a dream on 9 October 1925, while on a visit to Île Saint-Louis. He originally intended for it to be ready for early 1926, as Leopold Stokowski was ready to include it in a program at Carnegie Hall. However, the complicated musical language used in Arcana forced him to postpone its premiere, until Stokowski conducted it with the Philadelphia Orchestra on 8 April 1927 at the Academy of Music (Philadelphia).

As explained in his letter, the title 'arcana' refers to the mysteries of alchemy and a quote from Paracelsus's Hermetic Astronomy. Varèse explored the realm of dreams with the musical language present in Arcana, since he believed that the birth of art came from the unconscious and not from reason. The score is preceded by the following text, in Latin, English, and French:

The 1927 score was published by Max Eschig in 1931. On the occasion of the French premiere, Varèse revised the piece again in 1932. The revised version was premiered by Nicolas Slonimsky on 25 February 1932, in Paris. In 1964, one year before Varèse's death, the revised version was published by Colfranc. It has been available under Ricordi since the year 2000.

Structure 

Often described as a passacaglia, Arcana is a sixteen-minute symphonic poem in one movement scored for a large orchestra. It is scored for three piccolos, two flutes, three oboes, one English horn, one heckelphone, two clarinets in E-flat, two clarinets in B-flat, one contrabass clarinet, three bassoons, two contrabassoons, eight horns in F, five trumpets in C, two tenor trombones, one bass trombone, one contrabass trombone, one tuba, one contrabass tuba, sixteen first violins, sixteen second violins, fourteen violas, twelve cellos, ten double basses, one timpanist with six pedal timpani and six additional percussionists.

The percussion scoring is particularly large, as in most other pieces for orchestra by Varèse.

Some percussionists are required to trade places along the piece to play specific instruments from other performers.

References

External links 

 

Compositions by Edgard Varèse
1927 compositions
Symphonic poems